Luchaire is a surname. Notable people with the surname include:

 Corinne Luchaire (1921–1950), French actress
 Denis Jean Achille Luchaire (1846–1908), French historian
 Jean Luchaire (1901–1946), French journalist and collaborator